is a museum of fossils in Mizunami, Gifu Prefecture, Japan. The museum, which opened in 1974, has a special focus on the palaeoenvironment of the area and on the fossils of the Miocene . The collection includes some 250,000 fossils, of which around 3,000 are included in the permanent display.

Publications
  (1974–)

See also

 Gifu Prefectural Museum
 Fukui Prefectural Dinosaur Museum

References

External links
  Mizunami Fossil Museum
  Mizunami Fossil Museum
 Bulletin of the Mizunami Fossil Museum

Mizunami, Gifu
Museums in Gifu Prefecture
Museums established in 1974
1974 establishments in Japan
Natural history museums in Japan
Fossil museums